Bythinella badensis is a species of very small freshwater snail, an aquatic gastropod mollusk in the family Amnicolidae. This species is endemic to Germany.

References

Bythinella
Endemic fauna of Germany
Molluscs of Europe
Taxonomy articles created by Polbot